The Virginia Brewery is a former brewery in Virginia, Minnesota, United States.  It was built in 1905 and closed during Prohibition.  The building was listed on the National Register of Historic Places in 1980 for its local significance in the themes of architecture, commerce, and industry.  It was nominated for being a distinctive example of the local breweries that contributed to economic and social life (through athletic sponsorships) of the Iron Range before Prohibition and competition from larger brands put them out of business.

See also
 National Register of Historic Places listings in St. Louis County, Minnesota
 List of defunct breweries in the United States

References

1905 establishments in Minnesota
Beer brewing companies based in Minnesota
Brewery buildings in the United States
Buildings and structures in Virginia, Minnesota
Defunct brewery companies of the United States
Industrial buildings and structures on the National Register of Historic Places in Minnesota
Industrial buildings completed in 1905
National Register of Historic Places in St. Louis County, Minnesota
Richardsonian Romanesque architecture in Minnesota